The  Petit Serail ( / ALA-LC: as-sarāy as- ṣaghir; literally "Little Saray") was a historic administrative Ottoman building in Beirut that housed the seat of the Wali of Syria and Beirut. It was situated to the northern side of Martyrs' Square at the heart of the Beirut Central District. The building was the scene of important historical events, but plans to enlarge Beirut's main square led to its destruction in 1950. It was one of several Ottoman era building projects that shaped the architecture of Lebanon in Beirut.

Overview
Inaugurated in 1884, the Petit Serail was the seat of Beirut’s governor general in 1888 and hosted the Lebanese government and president during the French Mandate. Demolished in 1950, its foundations were uncovered and preserved in the mid-1990s.

Background
In the later half of the nineteenth century, the Beiruti authorities thought to move the seat of governorship from the decaying Emir Assaf saray also called Dar al-Wilaya (House of the Vilayet). The medieval structure was built in 1572 by Mohammad Assaf, the son of the Turkmen Emir Mansour Assaf.

On 11 September 1840, the British fleet bombarded Beirut to evacuate Ibrahim Pasha's troops from the city and damaged the old saray in the process. The saray was restored in 1843 by the wali of Beirut Assaad Mukhles Pasha.

In 1882 the board of administration of the Sanjak of Beirut  decided to build a new administrative building and put up the Emir Assaf Saray for auction. The saray was sold in April 1882 to Mohammad Ayyas and then to members of the Sursock and Tueini families. The old saray was destroyed and replaced by the Sursock souks while work was underway on the construction of the new saray which will become known as the "Petit Serail" to differentiate it from the Kışla-i Humayun (the Ottoman barracks) which is better known as the Grand Serail.

History

The Petit Serail was planned as a civic center following the Tanzimat reform and according to the Beirut municipality project of 1878. The northern side of Sahet el-Bourj was chosen as a strategic site since it occupied the heart of the new extra-mural city. The new structure was commissioned by Beirut mayor Ibrahim Fakhri Bey, construction began in 1881 at the site of a former saray that was ordered demolished by the Wali Hamdi Pasha.
The serail was built by Bechara Effendi Avedissian, chief engineer of the Vilayet of Syria and Youssef Effendi Khayat, engineer of the city of Beirut, but the project ran into financial difficulties as attested by a number of correspondence letters between the Wali of Syria Ahmad Hamdi Pasha and the Porte. Hamdi Pasha took up a loan form the Ottoman Bank, mortgaged public buildings and imposed new taxes in order to furnish the new serail's offices. In 1883, a park was inaugurated in the square in front of the Serail. The park was called "Hamidie" in honor of the reigning Sultan Abdul Hamid II, but was more commonly known as the Menshieh garden. The Petit Serail was inaugurated three years after the beginning of construction works in 1884.

Under the French Mandate, urban planner De La Halle planned the enlargement of the al-Bourj Square and the building of a new governmental office complex. He proposed in his 1939 plan to destroy the Serail to open up the square the waterfront through a series of landscaped terraces. The destruction of the Petit Serail did not take place until 1950, after Lebanon gained its independence. Nevertheless, the planned clearing of the square was aborted and the Regent Hotel and the Rivoli building were constructed at the site of the Serail in 1953. Solidere destroyed the Rivoli and Regent Hotel buildings in the 1990s, and consequent excavations revealed the foundations of the Petit Serail which will be preserved inside the planned underground Beirut City History Museum.

Function
The Serail was built to serve as the seat of the Vilayet of Syria; it housed municipal and provincial offices including Beirut's judicial court. In 1888 Beirut became the provincial capital of the Beirut Vilayet and the Petit Serail hosted the seat of the Wali. Beirut Wali Azmi Bey transferred the seat of the vilayet to the Grand Serail, while the municipal offices and the telegraph service office were moved to the Petit Serail.

Architecture

The Petit Serail was built in an eclectic occidentalist style, mixing baroque architectural elements with more austere features, a style that was predominant in the Ottoman constructions of the 19th century. The body of the two-story building was raised on a plinth, giving the building a greater stature. The oblong facade was built in Sandstone and is decorated with neo-baroque windows and elements. The main entrance was flanked by an imposing marble gate giving way to a central court and to the building's floors. A crenelated cornice ran the entire surface of the roof complete with bartizans flanking the corners; a layout reminiscent of Medieval European castles. In the central axis of the main facade stood a large ornate gable decorated with volutes surrounding a clock. The structure had a surface area of 3500 square cubits and contained close to 80 rooms.

Timeline
1878: Plan for the modernization of Sahat al-Burj (later Martyrs’ Square) by the Municipality of Beirut.

1881: Authorization from the Ottoman authorities to build the Serail.

1888: The Serail became the seat of the wali.

French Mandate: The seat of authority moved to the Grand Serail on Serail Hill, while the Petit Serail hosted the Lebanese president and government.

1950: The Petit Serail was demolished with the intention of connecting Martyrs’ Square to the sea.

1950s: Rivoli Cinema was built.

Mid-1990s: The foundations of the Petit Serail were uncovered and preserved.

See also

Beirut Central District
Grand Serail
Manouk Avedissian
Serail Hill
Martyrs' Square
Martyrs' Monument

References

{{Davie, May (1997) The History and Evolution of Public Spaces in Beirut Central District, Solidere, Beirut.

Kassir, Samir (2003). Histoire de Beyrouth, Fayard, Paris.}}

Buildings and structures completed in 1881
Buildings and structures of the Ottoman Empire
Palaces in Lebanon
Buildings and structures demolished in 1950
1881 establishments in the Ottoman Empire